NPFF  Neuropeptide FF (FLFQPQRFa) is a mammalian amidated neuropeptide originally isolated from bovine brain and characterized as a pain-modulating peptide, with anti-opioid activity on morphine-induced analgesia.

In humans, Neuropeptide FF peptides are encoded by the NPFF gene. Two genes encoding two different receptors (NPFF1 and NPFF2) and two precursors (NPFFA and NPFFB) have been cloned in several mammalian species.

Function 

Neuropeptide FF (NPFF) and RFamide related peptides issued from two precursors interact with good affinity with two subtypes of G protein-coupled receptors, namely NPFF1 and NPFF2 subtypes and are involved in several physiological functions such as cardiovascular regulation, hormonal control, macrophage activation, body temperature homeostasis and pain modulation.

Processing of the NPFFA precursor at basic proteolytic sites should generate a NPFF-containing peptide with three additional N-terminal amino acids different between species, and a NPSF (SLAAPQRFa)-containing peptide, the length of which depends on the species. NPFFB, identified as a precursor for RFamide-related peptides (RFRPs, also called GnIH for gonadotropin inhibitory hormone), contains a LPLRFa-containing peptide and a peptide sharing with NPFF the same C-terminal PQRFamide motif, such as NPVF (VPNLPQRFa) in human.

NPFF and opioid systems have been shown to interact at several levels, from animal behavior to receptor molecules. Nociception is the physiological function in which this interaction has been the most extensively studied but reward, locomotion, feeding and intestinal motility are also affected. Endogenous opioids are necessary for the analgesic properties of spinally injected NPFF while endogenous NPFF peptides are involved in the process of analgesic tolerance/hyperalgesia induced by chronic opioid treatment. 

NPFF also controls the number and metabolic effects of adipose tissue macrophages, and NPFF is necessary for adipose tissue health.

See also 
 Neuropeptide VF precursor

References

Further reading